Players and pairs who neither have high enough rankings nor receive wild cards may participate in a qualifying tournament held one week before the annual Wimbledon Tennis Championships.

Seeds

  Mikhail Elgin /  Alexander Kudryavtsev (first round)
  Sanchai Ratiwatana /  Sonchat Ratiwatana (qualifying competition, lucky losers)
  Martin Emmrich /  Andreas Siljeström (first round)
  Treat Huey /  Izak van der Merwe (qualified)
  Leoš Friedl /  David Martin (qualifying competition, lucky losers)
  Brian Battistone /  Purav Raja (first round)
  Ryan Harrison /  Travis Rettenmaier (qualified)
  Karol Beck /  David Škoch (qualified)

Qualifiers

  Ryan Harrison /  Travis Rettenmaier
  Karol Beck /  David Škoch
  David Rice /  Sean Thornley
  Treat Huey /  Izak van der Merwe

Lucky losers

  Sanchai Ratiwatana /  Sonchat Ratiwatana
  Leoš Friedl /  David Martin
  Lukáš Lacko /  Lukáš Rosol
  Alessandro Motti /  Stéphane Robert
  Flavio Cipolla /  Paolo Lorenzi

Qualifying draw

First qualifier

Second qualifier

Third qualifier

Fourth qualifier

External links

2011 Wimbledon Championships – Men's draws and results at the International Tennis Federation

Men's Doubles Qualifying
Wimbledon Championship by year – Men's doubles qualifying